The Panoplist was a religious monthly magazine printed from 1805 until 1820 edited by Jeremiah Evarts.

Other names for the publication 
The Panoplist; or, The Christian Armory (1805-1808).
Panoplist and Missionary Magazine (1808-1817), published in Boston by Jedediah Morse.
Panoplist and Missionary Herald (1818-1820).

References

External links
Congregational Library, Boston
See holdings at the Cambridge University Library.

19th century in Boston
1805 establishments in Massachusetts
Panoplist, The
Defunct magazines published in the United States
Magazines established in 1805
Magazines disestablished in 1820
Magazines published in Boston
Religious magazines published in the United States